The Claro Open Floridablanca (formerly known as Seguros Bolívar Open Bucaramanga and Claro Open Bucaramanga) is a professional tennis tournament played on outdoor red clay courts. It is currently part of the Association of Tennis Professionals (ATP) Challenger Tour. It is held annually in Floridablanca, Colombia, since 2009.

Past finals

Singles

Doubles

External links
Official website
ITF search

ATP Challenger Tour
Clay court tennis tournaments
Tennis tournaments in Colombia
Seguros Bolívar Open Bucaramanga